La Faculté des Sciences Infirmières de l'Université Épiscopale d'Haïti à Léogâne or FSIL (English- Faculty of Nursing Science of the Episcopal University of Haiti in Léogâne) is a baccalaureate nursing school located in Léogâne, Haiti.  It is the only four-year nursing school in Haiti and is part of the Université Épiscopale d'Haïti (UNEPH). The college receives financial support from the nonprofit 501(c)(3) Haiti Nursing Foundation.

The first class was admitted in January of 2005, and the dean is Hilda Alcindor, BA, RN.

References

External links
Faculté des Sciences Infirmières de l'Université Épiscopale d'Haïti à Léogâne - official website

Educational institutions established in 2005
Léogâne
Nursing schools in Haiti
2005 establishments in Haiti